Keith Egli (born January 20, 1962) was the Ottawa city councillor for Knoxdale-Merivale Ward from 2010 to 2022. He won the ward in the 2010 Ottawa municipal election, which was vacated by the retiring Gord Hunter.

Background
Egli was born in Montreal and moved to Ottawa as a teenager. He graduated from St. Pius X High School in Ottawa. He received a BA in Sociology and a law degree from the University of Ottawa.  Prior to his election, he was a lawyer and mediator in Ottawa for twenty years.  He is also a labour relations specialist.

Politics
Egli was first elected in 2010. His first election featured a crowded field of nine candidates, including Green Party activist James O'Grady and former Ontario Liberal candidate Rod Vanier. Egli was re-elected by a large margin in 2014. Egli was re-elected for the final time in 2018, beating his closest opponent, real-estate agent James Dean by over 4,000 votes. Egli endorsed Jim Watson for mayor in the 2018 Ottawa municipal election.

Egli announced he would not seek re-election in the 2022 Ottawa municipal election on April 20, 2022. Keith Egli's brother, Myles Egli ran as a candidate in the 2022 election to succeed Keith, but placed third, losing to Sean Devine.

Electoral record

References

External links
Biography

1962 births
Living people
Ottawa city councillors
University of Ottawa alumni
Politicians from Montreal
Anglophone Quebec people
21st-century Canadian politicians